Jeneile Osborne (born c. 1981), better known as Queen Omega, is a reggae singer born in Trinidad.

Biography
Osborne was born in San Fernando, Trinidad and Tobago. After singing in calypso and soca bands, she turned to reggae, and began performing roots reggae influenced by her adoption of the Rastafarian faith. She became based in England, where she began recording in 2000, releasing her self-titled debut album in 2001, and moved on to work with the Green House Family label. Her second album, Pure Love, was released in 2003. In 2004 she performed at the Rebel Salute festival. Her third album, Away From Babylon, was released in 2004, and Destiny followed in 2005. In 2008 she performed at many reggae festivals in North America, headlining the Northwest World Music festival in Eugene, Oregon. In 2009 she toured Brazil and France. In 2010 she recorded with Jah Sun on his Gravity EP and toured with Marcia Griffiths.

Discography
Queen Omega (2001), Jet Star
Pure Love (2003), Green House Family/Jet Star
Away From Babylon (2004), Charm/Jet Star
Destiny (2005), Nocturne/Special Delivery
Servant of Jah Army (2008), Ariwa
Together We Aspire, Together We Achieve (2012), Greatest Friends Records

References

Trinidad and Tobago reggae musicians
People from San Fernando, Trinidad and Tobago
1980s births
Living people